The P 26/40 was an Italian World War II heavy tank. It was armed with a 75 mm gun and an 8 mm Breda machine gun, plus another optional machine gun in an anti-aircraft mount. Design had started in 1940 but very few had been built by the time Italy signed the armistice with the Allies in September 1943 and the few produced afterwards were used by the Germans.

The official Italian designation was carro armato ("armoured vehicle") P 26/40. The designation means: P for pesante ("heavy"), the weight of 26 tonnes, and the year of adoption (1940).

History 
The development work began in 1940, on Benito Mussolini's specific orders. Initial requirements were for a 20 tonne (the maximum load allowed by pontoon bridges) tank with a 47 mm gun, three machine-guns and a crew of five, but this was quickly superseded by another 25 tonne design, to be named P26. The development work proceeded quickly except for the engine; the Italian military staff, the Stato Maggiore, wanted a diesel power-plant, while the builders favoured a petrol engine.

However, in Italy at the time there were no engines (diesel or petrol) available capable of developing the  required, and the Italian tank industry (i.e. the duopoly Fiat-Ansaldo) did not turn to easily available aircraft engines for its tanks as contemporary U.S. and British tank manufacturers had done. The design of a new engine was very slow, and in the end a  petrol engine (Fiat 262) was eventually tested, even though in the end it was not adopted.

Provisionally called P75 (from the gun's caliber), the first design (whose prototype was ready on mid-1941) was similar to an enlarged M13/40, but with a 75/18 howitzer (the same fitted on the Semovente da 75/18) and more armour; the prototype was then modified by replacing the main gun with a 75/32 gun with a co-axial machine-gun. After learning about Soviet T-34s in 1941, thanks to a captured tank supplied by the Germans, the whole design was radically modified: the armour was quickly thickened (from 40 to 50 mm on the front and from 30 to 40 mm on the sides) and re-designed, adopting more markedly sloped plates, and the new 75/34 gun was adopted; meanwhile the dual barbette mount in the hull was deleted. The gun designation "75/34" referred to a 75 mm bore diameter gun with a length equal to 34 calibres. However, the weight increase (which now topped at 26 tonne) and the difficulties in finding a suitable engine further hampered the start of mass production; in the end, it was decided that the prototype and the early production samples were to be equipped with a 330 HP SPA 8V diesel engine, later to be replaced by a 420 HP petrol engine.

Only a few (between one and five depending on the source) pre-production models were completed before the Italian Armistice in September 1943, at which point they were taken over by the German Wehrmacht. A few were used in combat, under the German designation of Panzerkampfwagen P40 737(i), for example at Anzio; some, without engines, were used as static strongpoints.

Combat history 
Only 21 P 40s were finished; during the armistice it served in the defence of Rome. The Germans ordered production to continue after the armistice and appropriated completed tanks to the Southern Tank Training Battalion, 10th and 15th Police Panzer Companies, and the 24th Waffen Mountain Division of the SS Karstjäger. The Southern Tank Training Battalion trained units to use captured Italian tanks and had five P 40s in their inventory. The 10th Police Panzer Company served in Russia before redeployment to northern Italy in late 1944 for anti-partisan duties with the 15th Police Panzer Company. Formed in summer of 1944, the 24th Waffen Mountain Division was deployed to Trieste and Udine along the Adriatic coast. While retreating towards Austria in March 1945, they lost several P 40 tanks to Shermans of the British 6th Armoured Division. About a hundred P 40s were used by the German military, of which about 40 were without engines and used as static emplacements at defensive positions such as the Gustav and Gothic Lines.

Design 
The turret was operated by two crew members and this was a significant drawback as it put excessive workload on the tank's commander. At that time, most new tanks were designed with three-man turrets. Moreover, it lacked a commander's cupola.

The main weapon was the 75/34 gun, a development of the Model 37 divisional gun (34 calibres long), retaining the same dimensions. Its armour-piercing shells could penetrate roughly 70 mm of armour at 500 meters. For secondary armament, the P 40 had a co-axial machine-gun and another which could be used in the anti-aircraft role, eschewing the traditional dual mount in the hull; the standard ammunition load was also lower, only around 600 rounds, compared to 3,000 of the "M" series.

The mechanical systems were a development of the "M" series, in particular the leaf spring suspension which was reliable, but in rough terrain would not allow speeds similar to the more modern Christie suspension or torsion bar suspension. Nevertheless, the good power-to-weight ratio represented a significant improvement in mobility over its predecessors.

The armour, quite resistant by Italian standards, was sloped and 60 mm thick at the turret front and mantlet (by comparison the M13/40 had 42 mm), but it was still riveted at a time when most tanks were constructed by welding. Compared to welded armour, riveted armour is vulnerable to breaking apart at the joints meaning that even quite resistant plates can be defeated by rivet failures. The front armour had a compound slope with a best facing of 50 mm/45 degrees.

The armour was capable of protecting the tank against early anti-tank guns such as the British QF 2 pounder (40 mm, 1.6 in), but was vulnerable to subsequent anti-tank weapons such as the British QF 6 pounder (57 mm, 2.24 in) that entered service in 1942, and was completely overmatched by the QF 17 pounder (76 mm, 3 in) coming into use in 1943.

The P 40 design was reasonably up-to-date, but the tank was without some modern features such as welded armour, modern suspension, and a cupola for the commander. The P 40 was designated as a heavy tank in Italy, not because of its weight, but because of its intended role in support of the widely used medium ("M") tanks on the battlefields. In weight, armour and armament it was similar to the medium tanks of the Wehrmacht or other contemporary armies, its armament and protection being roughly the same as the early production American M4 Sherman tank. It was the final evolution of Italian tank designs, that began with the Vickers-based tankettes (such as the CV29 and L3/35) and developed into models such as the M11/39 medium tank, a much heavier construction whose internal design shared many characteristics of the earlier tankettes.

Production
Some 1,200 tanks were ordered (but the total was later reduced to 500 when development work on the heavier P 43 began), but the start of production was delayed by the engine problems and by other factors, such as the bombing of the SPA factory in Turin in September 1942; in the end, production began only in summer 1943. About a hundred P 40s were built by Ansaldo from then until the end of the war, although most were not entirely completed because of a lack of engines.

Variants
There were at least two planned variants of the P 40, developed from early 1943 when the Italian Army realized that the tank was inferior to other designs such as the German Panther. The first one was named P 43, a tank with a weight of some 30 tonnes, with armour plates some 50–80 mm thick and a main armament of either the 75/34 gun or a 105/23 gun. In September 1943 Fiat and Ansaldo began development of a new design which could be comparable to the Panther, and the result was the P 43 bis, with heavily sloped armour, a 450 HP engine and a 90/42 gun. These designs never passed the wooden mock-up stage.

The other project was the Semovente 149/40, based on the P 40 hull. Only one of these vehicles was ever built. This gun was produced in very few numbers, and the Italian artillery remained equipped mainly with obsolete weapons for the duration of the war. Due to its mass, it was quite bulky to move, and so it was decided to build a self-propelled version, utilizing the most powerful of all Italian military vehicles. All space of the P 40 hull was dedicated to supporting the gun, so the ammunition and crew would have required additional vehicles to be moved. The gun would have been ready to fire in three minutes from coming to a stop, compared to the 17 minutes required by towed artillery.

Work on the Semovente 149/40 started in 1942 and the prototype was tested in 1943, but the Italian Army was not very impressed. After the Armistice the vehicle was acquired by the Germans, and they were not impressed by it either. Finally American forces captured it during the invasion of Germany and sent it to the Aberdeen Proving Ground for testing.

Surviving vehicles

Two P26/40s still exist, one preserved at the Museo della Motorizzazione in Rome and another is currently on display near the army barracks near Lecce.

See also

Tanks of comparable role, performance, and era

 Australian Sentinel
 British Cromwell
 Canadian Ram II
 German Panzer IV
 Hungarian Turán III
 Italian P43 (proposal)
 Japanese Type 3 Chi-Nu
 Romanian 1942 medium tank (proposal)
 Soviet T-34
 Swedish Stridsvagn m/42
 United States M4 Sherman

References

Sources 
 C. Falessi and B. Pafi, "Il carro armato P. 40", Storia Illustrata #150, May 1970.
 Pignato, Nicola, Storia dei mezzi corazzati, Fratelli Fabbri Editore, 1976, volume 2
 Sgarlato, Nico, I corazzati italiani, an illustrated monograph on Italian tanks and self-propelled guns, April 2006.
 F Cappellano & P P Battistelli (2012). Italian Medium Tanks (New Vanguard No. 195) UK: Osprey Publishing. .

World War II tanks of Italy
World War II heavy tanks
Gio. Ansaldo & C. armored vehicles
Military vehicles introduced from 1940 to 1944